"Algún Día" (English: "Someday") is a song by Mexican singer-songwriter Julieta Venegas released as the second single from her album MTV Unplugged in 2008. Released on September 10, 2008 in Mexico and several Latin American countries.

Song information

The song was written and performed by Julieta Venegas herself on the MTV Unplugged, in collaboration with Gustavo Santaolalla playing the banjo and singing.

Tracking list
CD Single
"Algún Día" featuring Gustavo Santaolalla — 4:00

Charts

Weekly charts

References

Julieta Venegas songs
2008 songs
Songs written by Julieta Venegas